The Karlsruher SV Rugby is a German rugby union club from Karlsruhe, currently playing in the 2. Rugby-Bundesliga. It is part of a larger club, the Karlsruher SV, which also offers other sports like tennis and association football.

History
The KSV was formed in 1991 through a merger of to local clubs, the FC Nordstern Rintheim, formed 1909, and the FC Waldstadt, formed in 1962.

The clubs rugby department achieved promotion to the 2. Rugby-Bundesliga from the Rugby-Regionalliga in 2003, finishing fifth in the new league in its first season there.

The second season ended with relegation back to the Regionalliga and it took the club until 2009, to return to the second division. Hopelessly outclassed at this level, the club withdrew its team from the competition at the winter break, KSV therefore being automatically relegated from the league. In 2010-11 KSV made a new start playing in the lowest league, the Rugby-Verbandsliga Baden-Württemberg, the fifth division, to rebuild and restructure the squad and management of the rugby department. In 2011-12 the team played in the Regionalliga Baden-Württemberg and finished in 2nd place. Since the 2012-13 season KSV plays in the 3rd Liga South/West. They finished the 2015-2016 Season in 2nd place and got repromoted to the 2. Rugby-Bundesliga, after winning the Playoff-Games against RC Unterföhring.

Women's team

The Women's team is currently competing in the german-Rugby sevens-championship for women.

Club honours
 Rugby-Regionalliga Baden-Württemberg
 Champions: 2009

Recent seasons
Recent seasons of the club:

 1 From 2005 to 2008, the club did not field an independent team but rather played in a partnership with clubs from Heidelberg and Pforzheim

References

External links
  Official website
  Karlsruher SV club info at totalrugby.de

German rugby union clubs
Rugby clubs established in 1991
Rugby union in Baden-Württemberg
1991 establishments in Germany